This is a list of episodes for Fast N' Loud Season 8. Season 8 started on March 23, 2015.

References 

2015 American television seasons